Plötzlich Papa – Einspruch abgelehnt! is a German television series.

See also
List of German television series

External links
 

2008 German television series debuts
2012 German television series endings
German-language television shows
Sat.1 original programming
German legal television series